Alfred Velazquez Rascon (born September 10, 1945) is a retired United States Army lieutenant colonel.  In 2000, he was awarded the Medal of Honor—the United States' highest military decoration—for his actions as a medic near Long Khánh Province during the Vietnam War.

On more than one occasion Rascon exposed himself to enemy fire and grenades by covering the bodies of those whom he was aiding with his own. In addition to Vietnam, Rascon also served as a medical officer in the wars in Afghanistan and Iraq.

Early life
Rascon was born in Chihuahua, Mexico on September 10, 1945, as the only child of Alfredo and Andrea Rascon. The Rascon family, in search of a better life, emigrated to the United States. They settled in Oxnard, California, where Rascon received his primary and secondary education. In August 1963, he graduated from Oxnard High School and enlisted in the United States Army.

Rascon received his Basic training in Fort Ord, California, and after completing he was assigned to Fort Sam Houston, Texas for basic and specialist medical training.  After he graduated from his medical training, he volunteered for airborne training and attended the Army's Airborne school in Fort Benning, Georgia.

Vietnam War

In February 1964, Rascon was then assigned to Medical Platoon, Headquarters Company, 1st Battalion, 503rd Infantry (Airborne) of the 173rd Airborne Brigade (Separate) stationed in Okinawa.

In May 1965, Rascon and his unit were deployed to the Republic of Vietnam where he served as a medic for a platoon of paratroopers. The brigade was the first major ground combat unit of the United States Army to serve there. They were the first to go into War Zone D to destroy enemy base camps and to introduce the use of small long-range patrols.

On March 16, 1966, Rascon was assigned as a medic to a Reconnaissance Platoon of the 173rd Airborne Brigade. The Reconnaissance Platoon's mission was to reinforce a sister battalion which was under intense enemy attack near Long Khánh Province, when it found itself under heavy fire from a numerically superior enemy force. Several point squad soldiers were wounded and Specialist Four Rascon made his way forward to aid his fallen comrades.  In more than one occasion Rascon exposed himself to enemy fire and grenades by covering the bodies of those whom he was aiding and absorbing the blast and fragments of the grenades with his own body. Each time he would drag his comrades to safety and crawled back to aid someone else. Rascon was so badly wounded that day that he was given his last rites.

Rascon was transferred to Johnson Army Hospital in Japan where he spent six months recovering from his wounds. For his actions, he was nominated for the Medal of Honor. However, his nomination for some unknown reason did not go through and instead he was awarded a Silver Star. In May 1966, he was honorably discharged from active duty and placed in the Army Reserves. Rascon attended college after he was discharged and in 1967 he became a Naturalized United States Citizen.

In 1970 Rascon graduated from the Army's Infantry Officers Candidate School and was commissioned as a second lieutenant of Infantry. He then returned to Vietnam for a second tour, this time as a military adviser. In 1976, Rascon was once again honorably discharged from active duty with the rank of captain, but continued serving in the United States Army Reserve until 1984.

Post-Vietnam

In 1976, Rascon was offered the position of United States Army military liaison officer, in the Republic of Panama and he accepted. Rascon has also worked for the Department of Justice's, Drug Enforcement Administration, INTERPOL (U.S. National Central Bureau), and the Immigration & Naturalization Service.

During a 1985 reunion of the 173rd Airborne Brigade, Rascon's comrades discovered that he never received the Medal of Honor. His former platoon members Ray Compton, Neil Haffey and Larry Gibson, whose lives he saved, sought to correct the oversight and renewed their efforts in favor of a Medal of Honor for Rascon. The Pentagon would not reconsider Rascon's case because so much time had elapsed. Therefore, Rascon's comrades sought the help of Congressman Lane Evans from Illinois. In 1997, Evans gave President Bill Clinton a packet containing the information about Rascon. The President then convinced the Pentagon to reopen the case. On February 8, 2000, President Bill Clinton bestowed upon Rascon the Medal of Honor in a ceremony held in the East Room of the White House.

Medal of Honor
Medal of Honor citation:

Later years
On May 22, 2002, Rascon was confirmed by the United States Senate as the 10th director of the Selective Service System; he served in this position until 2003.

On September 1, 2002, Rascon returned to the army as an Army Reserve major in the Army Medical Service Corps. His position was individual mobilization augmentee to the Surgeon General's Office. Rascon served in Afghanistan and Iraq with the Medical Service Corps. He retired from the military with the rank of lieutenant colonel.

Honors
Rascon received the degree of Doctor of Medical Jurisprudence, Honoris Causa on May 17, 2003, from the Uniformed Services University of Health Sciences' (USUHS) F. Edward Hebert School of Medicine and Graduate School of Nursing.
The army has honored Rascon by renaming their training school for medics at Fort Campbell, Kentucky, the Alfred V. Rascon School of Combat Medicine. 
 
Rascon has been honored by the American Immigration Lawyers Association and Foundation in Washington, D.C., for his past contributions in the military. The Washington-based CATO Institute also honored him in its annual honors of past and present military contributors of Hispanic Americans. He resides in Laurel, Maryland and is married and has a daughter and a son.

Awards and recognitions

Among Alfred V. Rascon's decorations and medals are the following:

See also

List of Medal of Honor recipients for the Vietnam War
Hispanic Medal of Honor recipients

References

External links

 ( 2009-10-25)

1945 births
United States Army personnel of the Vietnam War
United States Army Medal of Honor recipients
Mexican emigrants to the United States
Recipients of the Silver Star
Recipients of the Gallantry Cross (Vietnam)
United States Army soldiers
Combat medics
People from Chihuahua (state)
Living people
Foreign-born Medal of Honor recipients
People from Laurel, Maryland
People from Oxnard, California
Vietnam War recipients of the Medal of Honor
George W. Bush administration personnel